Prairie Township, Ohio may refer to:

Prairie Township, Franklin County, Ohio
Prairie Township, Holmes County, Ohio

Ohio township disambiguation pages